refers to a type of Japanese pottery that is produced in Aizuwakamatsu, Fukushima Prefecture, Japan.

External links 
 https://www.japanhoppers.com/tohoku/aizuwakamatsu/kanko/1466/

Japanese pottery
Aizuwakamatsu